Acanthogonatus birabeni is a mygalomorph spider of Argentina, named after Max Birabén, an Argentinian arachnologist. It differs from others in the patagonicus group by its smaller size and (except for A. fuegianus) by the less developed bulb keels.

Description
Male: total length ; cephalothorax length , width ; cephalic region length , width ; medial ocular quadrangle length , width ; labium length , width ;sternum length , width . Its labium possesses no cuspules. A serrula is apparently present as a small patch of denticles. Its posterior sternal sigilla is small, shallow and marginal; its sternum weakly rebordered. Chelicerae: rastellum is formed by long, thin, stiff setae. Cheliceral tumescence is present. Leg I: tibia long and cylindrical, with an apical prolateral spur typical for this genus; metatarsus evenly curved downward in its basal third, the remainder being straight. The entire spider is a light yellow colour, with a dorsal abdominal pattern similar to that in A. patagonicus.

Distribution
Known only from its type locality: Puerto Madryn, Chubut, Argentina.

References

Further reading
Study on a Mygalomorph spider community in central Argentina:

External links

 ADW entry

Pycnothelidae
Spiders of Argentina
Spiders described in 1995